Woman with Flowers ( or ) is a marble sculpture  in height executed by Andrea del Verrocchio between 1475 and 1480. It is in the Bargello Museum in Florence.

The identity of the woman could be Fioretta Gorini, spouse of Giuliano de' Medici, Lucrezia Donati, platonic love of Lorenzo il Magnifico, or Ginevra d'Amerigo Benci, also portrayed in a painting by Leonardo da Vinci.

Dama col mazzolino influenced Leonardo's Studies of hands. It stands out for having the hands on the chest.

References

Bibliography 

 
 

Sculptures by Andrea del Verrocchio
Marble sculptures in Italy
Busts in Italy